Brahim Benzaza (born 8 April 1997) is an Algerian professional footballer who plays as a midfielder for Algerian Ligue Professionnelle 1 club USM Alger.

Career
In 2021, he signed a two-year contract with USM Alger.

References

External links
 
 

Living people
1997 births
Algerian footballers
Association football midfielders
ES Mostaganem players
ASO Chlef players
USM Alger players
Algerian Ligue Professionnelle 1 players
People from Mostaganem
21st-century Algerian people